Asociacion Deportiva Santacruceña was a Costa Rican football (soccer) club based in Santa Cruz, Costa Rica.

History
Founded as a football club in September 2003, the club quickly rose to prominence when it managed to reach the Costa Rican Primera División in two years, winning promotion from the Liga Ascenso in 2005 after beating Fusión Tibás in a promotion playoff.

They were relegated in summer 2007 and spent two seasons in the Segunda División de Costa Rica before withdrawing from the league in December 2008 due to financial problems.

Historical list of coaches
 Hernán Fernando Sosa (2004 – Nov 19, 2005)
 Orlando de León (Nov 19, 2005–2006)
 Alejandro Larrea (Jul 2006– Oct 15, 2006)
 John Henry Villafuerte (Oct 18, 2006 – Dec 2006)
 Ramón Vecinos (Jan 10, 2007 – Jul 2007)

References

Defunct football clubs in Costa Rica
Association football clubs established in 2003
2003 establishments in Costa Rica
Association football clubs disestablished in 2008